Wigg may refer to:

 Wigg (surname)
 Vöggr or Wigg, man in Scandinavian legend notable for giving Hrólfr Kraki (Hroðulf in Beowulf) his cognomen kraki, and for avenging his death
 WIGG (AM), defunct radio station (1420 AM) in Wiggins, Mississippi, United States
 Friedrich Heinrich Wiggers also known as F. H. Wigg, German botanist

See also
 Ludwig Vörg, Ludwig "Wiggerl" Vörg, mountaineer
 Wiig, surname